George Muir (21 January 1940 – 13 December 1999) was a Scottish footballer who played for Partick Thistle and Dumbarton.

References

1940 births
1999 deaths
Scottish footballers
Partick Thistle F.C. players
Dumbarton F.C. players
Scottish Football League players
Association football fullbacks